The Torch Honor Society was founded on March 8, 1916 in order to recognize merit and achievement on the part of undergraduate students of Yale College. Each Spring, the society elected ten juniors on the basis of outstanding achievement in University activities and scholarship, irrespective of society or fraternity affiliation.

An uplifted torch was chosen as the society's symbol in order to signify allegiance to the university's motto "Lux et Veritas" (Light and Truth), as well as devotion to the ideals of enlightening leadership and beneficent service. A broad circle supporting the torch symbolizes equality and comradeship in mutual endeavors, while a third symbol, the Roman numeral X, marks the initial class unit of ten adopted by the founders, and is set across and within the broad circle encompassing the central design. 
 
The society originally selected two professors as charter members, and has at various times conferred honorary titles upon Yale graduates and faculty.

As an honor society, it was able to tap members of other societies including several Bonesmen, however during the 1960s, the society disbanded and much of their original furniture was taken by current members to their respective tombs.  In the 1990s, the society was reconstituted as a senior "secret" society and now selects sixteen members for each delegation during "Tap Night" with the other secret societies.

Society members wear black robes with white masks and are in company of a blazing torch during their walks throughout campus.

The society's motto: "Simus Lux Obscuro in Mundo"

Original Location: SSS 4th floor opposite Aurelian Honor Society; Torch's symbol can still be visualized on the backside of SSS, marking their place in Yale's history.

Honor societies
Yale University
Secret societies at Yale
Student organizations established in 1916
1916 establishments in Connecticut